The Szolnok–Kiskunfélegyháza railway is the number 145 line. The line from Szolnok to Kiskunfélegyháza is 65 km long.

See also
List of railways in Hungary

External links

Railway lines in Hungary